Cashmere was an American music group best known for their boogie and soul hits, including "Can I" and "Do It Any Way You Wanna".

Career
The group formed in 1982 consisting of members Dwight Dukes, keyboardist McKinley Horton, drummer Daryl Burgee, and vocalist Keith Steward. They achieved several hits on the US Billboard R&B and Dance charts between 1983 and 1985. Their debut single "Do It Anyway You Wanna" peaked at No. 21 on the Dance charts and No. 35 on the R&B charts. It also peaked at No. 77 in the UK Singles Chart. A further release "Can I" peaked at No. 29 on the same chart.

In 1985, the group released an eponymous album which included the song "Can I". The album reached No. 49 on the US R&B Albums chart and No. 63 on the UK Albums Chart. Despite the success the group disbanded the same year.

Discography

Albums

Singles

References

External links
 Discography at Discogs.

Musical groups from Philadelphia
Musical groups established in 1982
Musical groups disestablished in 1985
American boogie musicians
American soul singers
American dance music groups
1982 establishments in Pennsylvania